Zhukovsky District is an administrative and municipal district (raion), one of the twenty-four in Kaluga Oblast, Russia. It is located in the northeast of the oblast. Its administrative center is the town of Zhukov. Population:   46,180 (2002 Census);  The population of Zhukov accounts for 26.0% of the district's total population.

References

Notes

Sources

Districts of Kaluga Oblast